Rachel Loy is an American bass player, songwriter, and indie recording artist, originally from Austin, Texas.  Loy burst onto the scene while still studying at Berklee College of Music with the hit song, "The Same Man," released by Sony, which is an account of a friend serving in Iraq. Her albums include Love the Mess (2005), Being Little (2006), and Tongue and Teeth (2007).

In 2008 she moved to Nashville, Tennessee and began playing bass on the road and in the studio.  She has recorded with country stars Brothers Osborne, Vince Gill, Willie Nelson, Dolly Parton, Dierks Bentley, Toby Keith, Brett Eldredge, Charlie Worsham, Allison Moorer, Granger Smith, and many others.  She has performed live with Kenny Chesney, Garth Brooks, Carrie Underwood, Alan Jackson, Darius Rucker, Hank Williams Jr, Jason Aldean, Trisha Yearwood, and many others.

Discography

Selected Recording Discography

References

Year of birth missing (living people)
Living people
American women rock singers
American women pop singers
American women singer-songwriters
American session musicians
Singer-songwriters from Texas
21st-century American women